Sami Mohamed Al-Hashash (born 15 September 1959) is a Kuwaiti football defender who played for Kuwait in the 1982 FIFA World Cup. He also played for Al-Arabi SC.

References

External links
FIFA profile

1959 births
Kuwaiti footballers
Kuwait international footballers
Association football defenders
1982 FIFA World Cup players
1984 AFC Asian Cup players
Olympic footballers of Kuwait
Footballers at the 1980 Summer Olympics
Living people
1980 AFC Asian Cup players
AFC Asian Cup-winning players
Footballers at the 1990 Asian Games
Asian Games competitors for Kuwait
Al-Arabi SC (Kuwait) players
Kuwait Premier League players